Annex Creek may refer to:

Annex Creek (Alaska), near Juneau, Alaska
Annex Creek (Tennessee), in Grainger County, Tennessee